Martur(Assembly constituency) was one of the 294 Legislative Assembly constituencies of Andhra Pradesh state in India.It was in Prakasam district and was dissolved before the 2009 elections and most of its area is now in Parchur (Assembly constituency) and Addanki (Assembly constituency).

History of the constituency
The Martur Assembly Constituency was first Created in the 1955 Andhra State Assembly Elections and exist till 1967 and later abolished in the  Delimitation Act 1961. It was again reformed in the 1978 Assembly Elections and exist till 2009 . After passing of the Delimitation of Parliamentary and Assembly Constituencies Order, 1976, its extent was the Martur and Kommalapadu firkas in Addanki taluk, Marella firka, Tammalur, Sankarapuram, Avisanavaripalem, Polavaram, Pedaravipad, Vempadu, Mundlamur, Malkapuram villages
in Tallur firka of Darsi taluk.
. Again it was Abolished due to Delimitation of Parliamentary and Assembly Constituencies Order, 2008 and hence was defunct as of the 2009 Andhra Pradesh Legislative Assembly election.

Members of the Legislative assembly

Election Results

Assembly Elections 2004

Assembly elections 1999

Assembly elections 1994

Assembly elections 1989

Assembly elections 1985

Assembly elections 1983

Assembly elections 1978

Assembly elections 1962

Assembly elections 1955

References

Legislative Assembly constituencies of Indian states
Andhra Pradesh Legislative Assembly